BPM Cube is the second self-cover album by J-pop duo Two-Mix, released by WEA Japan on August 9, 2000. It includes the single "Naked Dance". Disc 1 consists of English-language versions of the duo's hit songs, while Disc 2 features new remixes of the duo's singles.

The album peaked at No. 16 on Oricon's weekly albums chart.

Track listing 
All lyrics are written by Shiina Nagano, except where indicated; all music is composed by Minami Takayama, except where indicated; all music is arranged by Two-Mix.

Charts

References

External links 
 
 
 

2000 compilation albums
Two-Mix albums
English-language Japanese albums
Japanese-language compilation albums
Warner Music Japan compilation albums